Peachtree Road Tour was a concert tour by Elton John. The tour started in on 4 November 2004 with the album launch in Atlanta. The tour was to promote Elton's latest album Peachtree Road. The tour moved on to Europe for two dates at the end of the year. The following year, 2005, Elton toured in promotion with the album in North America before returning tour Europe once again.  The tour came to an end on 14 December 2005 in Zürich, Switzerland.

On the European Tour Elton and his band performed several very large-scale concerts at Reading, Southampton, Norwich, Huddersfield, Stoke-on-Trent, Coventry, Watford and Dublin.

Tour dates

Cancellations and rescheduled shows

Setlists

References

External links
 Information Site with Tour Dates

Notes

Elton John concert tours
2004 concert tours
2005 concert tours